The Plan Man (lit. "Plan Man") is a 2014 South Korean romantic comedy film that tells the story of an anal retentive man who attempts to escape from his fixation of trying to plan out every detail of his life. Starring Jung Jae-young and Han Ji-min, it is the feature directorial debut of Seong Si-heub.

Plot
Jung-seok is a magaling na librarian who goes about his daily life with everything planned down to the second. Having obsessive–compulsive personality disorder, he wakes up, crosses the road, visits the convenience store and goes to bed at the same time every day. Whenever he sees anything out of place, he can't help himself but to rectify it, a trait that is particularly irksome to his co-workers. Jung-seok develops a crush for a local convenience store's cashier who demonstrates a similar attention to order and cleanliness. When he finally works up the courage to tell her his feelings, he bumps into So-jung instead, a messy musician and free spirit whose life is lived spontaneously, adventurously and impulsively. With So-jung's help, he tries to woo his dream girl, but the only catch is that she wants someone who doesn't share her obsession for neatness. So now Jung-seok must break his routine and place himself outside of his comfort zone, as So-jung asks him to enter a singing audition program together with her.

Cast
Jung Jae-young as Han Jung-seok
Han Ji-min as Yoo So-jung  
Cha Ye-ryun as Lee Ji-won
Jang Gwang as Goo Sang-yoon
Kim Ji-young as Psychiatrist
Joo Jin-mo as Laundry
Choi Won-young as Kang Byung-soo
Yoo Seung-mok as Writer Lee
Jo Yong-jin as young Jung-seok
Go Seo-hee as Jung-seok's mother
Park Gil-soo as Section chief Nam
Park Jin-joo as Eun-ha
Park Jin-woo as Sang-hoon 
So Hee-jung as Kyung-mi
Lee Han-na as High school girl 
Ha Jae-sook as Lethargic woman 
Kim Ji-hoon  as Big man 
Sung Byung-sook as Mi-young
Lee Ye-eun as Min-ji 
Jung Young-gi as Manager
Sung Gi-wook as PD Seo

References

External links
  
 
 
 

South Korean romantic comedy films
2014 films
2010s South Korean films